The 2017 Porsche Carrera Cup Australia was an Australian motor racing series for Porsche 911 GT3 Cup (Type 991) cars. It was sanctioned by the Confederation of Australian Motor Sport (CAMS) as a National Series with Porsche Cars Australia Pty Ltd appointed as the Category Manager. It was the 13th Carrera Cup to be contested in Australia in which the series was won by David Wall.

Teams and drivers

Notes
  — raced as number 104 at the Sepang Round and number 4 for all other rounds
  — raced as number 105 at the Sepang Round and number 5 for all other rounds
  — raced as number 107 at the Sepang Round and number 7 for all other rounds
  — raced as number 133 at the Sepang Round and number 33 for all other rounds
  — raced as number 108 at the Sepang Round and number 8 for all other rounds
  — raced as number 109 at the Sepang Round and number 9 for all other rounds
  — raced as number 122 at the Sepang Round and number 22 for all other rounds
  — raced as number 138 at the Sepang Round and number 38 for all other rounds
  — raced as number 170 at the Sepang Round and number 70 for all other rounds
  — raced as number 177 at the Sepang Round and number 77 for all other rounds
  — raced as number 188 at the Sepang Round and number 88 for all other rounds

Race calendar
The series was contested over eight rounds with a joined round with Porsche Carrera Cup Asia at Sepang International Circuit in Malaysia.

 † New lap records

Series standings

References

External links
 

Australian Carrera Cup Championship seasons
Porsche Carrera Cup Australia